Erik Eriksen (28 February 1904 – 8 January 1982) was a Danish footballer. He played in two matches for the Denmark national football team in 1929.

References

External links
 

1904 births
1982 deaths
Danish men's footballers
Denmark international footballers
Sportspeople from Frederiksberg
Association football forwards
Kjøbenhavns Boldklub players